Nuno Melo (8 February 1960 – 9 June 2015) was a Portuguese actor. He appeared in more than ninety films from 1982 to 2015.

Biography
Melo was born in Castelo Branco on 8 February 1960. He worked as a cinema, theatre and television actor. He died of liver cancer in Lisbon on 9 June 2015. He was buried in the Alto de S. João cemetery on 10 June. He had a daughter (born 1987).

Selected filmography

References

External links 

1960 births
2015 deaths
Portuguese male film actors
Deaths from cancer in Portugal
Deaths from liver cancer